The 2022 World Series of Poker Europe (WSOPE) was the 13th edition of the World Series of Poker Europe, a series of poker tournaments organized by the WSOP. It was between October 26-November 16 at King's Casino in Rozvadov, Czech Republic and consisted of 15 WSOP bracelet events.

Event schedule

Source:

Main Event

The €10,350 No-Limit Hold'em Main Event began on November 11 with the first of two starting flights. The event attracted 763 total entrants, making it the largest Main Event in WSOPE history.

The top 115 players finished in the money and earned a share of the €7,248,500 prizepool, with the champion earning €1,380,129. Sweden's Omar Eljach, who finished second in Event #6 earlier in the 2022 WSOPE, beat another 2022 bracelet winner, Jonathan Pastore of France, to win the title and his first WSOP bracelet.

Final Table

*Career statistics prior to the 2022 WSOPE Main Event

Final Table results

References

External links
Official website
Hendon Mob results

World Series of Poker Europe
2022 in poker